Annie Caputo is an American political advisor and government official. She most recently served as a member of the Nuclear Regulatory Commission a five-year term that expired on June 30, 2021. She was formerly a senior policy advisor for Chairman John Barrasso (R-WY) on the United States Senate Committee on Environment and Public Works.

Career 
Caputo began her career as an executive assistant and congressional affairs manager for nuclear power plant operator Exelon. From 2005 to 2006 and again from 2012 to 2015, Caputo worked for the United States House Committee on Energy and Commerce, where she handled nuclear energy issues. She has advised the United States House of Representatives, United States Senate, and industry on nuclear energy regulation, policy development, legislation, and communications. She was a senior policy advisor for Jim Inhofe (R-OK) from 2007 to 2012, when he chaired the United States Senate Committee on Environment and Public Works.

References

Living people
University of Wisconsin–Madison alumni
Trump administration personnel
Year of birth missing (living people)
Virginia Republicans
Nuclear Regulatory Commission officials